is the capital city of Yamagata Prefecture located in the Tōhoku region of northern Japan. , the city had an estimated population of 248,772 in 103,165 households, and a population density of 650 persons per km2.

Geography
Yamagata is in the southern portion of the Yamagata Basin in southeast Yamagata Prefecture. The northern and northwestern parts of the city are flatland, and the eastern part of the city is occupied by the Ōu Mountains. The city includes Mount Zaō within its borders. The Mamigasaki River passes through the city, and the Tachiyagawa River forms the border between Yamagata and Tendō.

Neighboring municipalities
Yamagata Prefecture
Tendō
Kaminoyama
Higashine
Nanyō
Yamanobe
Nakayama
Miyagi Prefecture
Sendai
Kawasaki

Climate
Yamagata has a Humid continental climate (Köppen climate classification Dfa) with large seasonal temperature differences, with warm to hot (and often humid) summers and cold (sometimes severely cold) winters. Precipitation is significant throughout the year, but is heaviest from July to September. Yamagata city is part of the heavy snow area of Japan (Gosetsu chitai) with snowfall most days throughout the winter season.

Yamagata City is located in a wide central valley that can heat up quickly in spring and summer and is often grey and humid, while to the east in Miyagi Prefecture on the Pacific coast it is usually clearer and more temperate.

Demographics
Per Japanese census data, the population of Yamagata has remained relatively steady over the past 40 years.

History
The area of present-day Yamagata was part of Dewa Province. During the Edo period, it was a castle town and the center of Yamagata Domain under the Tokugawa shogunate. The city of Yamagata was founded on April 1, 1889 as the capital of Yamagata Prefecture with the creation of the modern municipalities system. The city attained special city status on April 1, 2001. The city's status is then further elevated into a core city on April 1, 2019.

Government
Yamagata has a mayor-council form of government with a directly elected mayor and a unicameral city legislature of 33 members. The city contributes nine members to the Yamagata Prefectural Assembly.  In terms of national politics, the city is part of Yamagata District 1 of the lower house of the Diet of Japan.

Education
Yamagata has 36 public elementary schools and 15 public middle schools operated by the city government and ten public high schools operated by the Yamagata Prefectural Board of Education. There are also four private high schools.  The prefecture also operates three special education schools for the handicapped.

Universities
Yamagata University, including Kojirakawa Campus (Faculty of Literature & Social Science, the Faculty of Science and the Faculty of Education, Art & Science) and Iida Campus (Faculty of Medicine, School of Nursing and University Hospital).
Yamagata Prefectural University of Health Sciences
Tohoku University of Art & Design
Tohoku Bunkyo College

High schools
Yamagata East H.S.
Yamagata South H.S.
Yamagata West H.S.
Yamagata North H.S.
Yamagata Technical H.S.
Yamagata Central H.S.
Kajo-Gakuen H.S.
Yamagata Civic Commercial H.S.
Yamagata-Gakuin H.S.
Yamagata-Johoku H.S.
Tōkai University Yamagata Senior H.S.
Nihon University Yamagata Senior H.S. 
Yamamoto-Gakuen H.S.
Yamagata-Meisei H.S.

Transportation

Railway
 East Japan Railway Company - Yamagata Shinkansen
 
 East Japan Railway Company -  Ōu Main Line(Yamagata Line)
  -  -  -  -  - ]
 East Japan Railway Company -  Senzan Line
  -  -  -  -  -  - 
 East Japan Railway Company -  - Aterazawa Line
  -  -

Highway
  – Yamagata-chūō, Yamagata-Kaminoyama interchanges
  – Yamagata-Zaō, Yamagata-kita, Sekizawa interchanges

Culture

Local events
 - one of Tōhoku's major summer festivals, is held in the city every August 5, 6 and 7. Yamagata also hosts the bi-annual Yamagata International Documentary Film Festival. An autumn tradition is Imoni-kai (taro potato party). Taro potatoes, thin-sliced meat, and vegetables are cooked in a large pot at picnic spots.  The banks of the Mamigasaki River are popular. Once a year, on the first Sunday in September, the city government serves thousands of bowls from its giant iron pot, which is serviced by a building crane. In 2009, 30,000 servings were prepared and served, and still a crowd waited in line.

Local attractions
 Yama-dera (Ryushaku-ji) lies within the city limits, 15 minutes by train from the center.
 Kajo Park, located in the city center of town northwest of the train station, is the extensive grounds of castle keep of feudal warlord Mogami Yoshiaki. While most of the park is athletic fields and public function buildings, the rebuilt walls, eastern main gate, and surrounding moat of the former castle are impressive. The Mogami Yoshiaki Historical Museum nearby features items from the Edo period, and information on these exhibits and the history of the castle town. It also contains a small public museum with displays of natural and social history.
Yamagata Museum of Art.
Mt. Zao, located just 40 minutes via bus from Yamagata Station is the massive mountain known as Mt. Zao.  This is one of Japan's most famous places for skiing and snowboarding and also has many hiking courses to enjoy.  There is also an onsen town here with many ryokan and public baths to soak in the water of Mt. Zao.
Bunshokan, the former prefectural office of Yamagata has now been remade as a museum that shows the history of Yamagata Prefecture and also is completely free for visitors to enter and look around. 
Chitosekan, is one of Yamagata's oldest and most famous ryotei restaurants and was built by the same designer who made the bunshokan office in the center of Yamagata City. 
Hirashimizu is an artisans village located just 15 minutes from the center of Yamagata City and has many pottery shops and craft shops to explore.

International relations

Twin towns – sister cities
Yamagata is twinned with:

 Boulder, United States (1994)
 Jilin City, China (1983)
 Kitzbühel, Austria (1963)
 Swan Hill, Australia (1980)
 Ulan-Ude, Russia (1991)

Partner cities

 Ōshima, Japan (1978)
 Kami, Japan (1989)
 Tainan, Taiwan (2017)

Notable people
Yoshiharu Abe, musician
Joji Kato, speed skater
Yoshitaka Kuroda, racing driver
Yoshimi Niizeki, professional golfer
Ken Okuyama, industrial designer
Yuko Oga, basketball player
Ito Ogawa, writer
Shozo Sasahara, wrestler
Chihiro Suzuki, voice actor
Miyuki Takahashi, volleyball player
Iwahiko Tsumanuma, architect
Eriko Watanabe, actress

References

External links

Official Website 
English Travel Website 

 
Cities in Yamagata Prefecture